Olga Rubin (born August 18, 1989) is a Russian-born Israeli female mixed martial artist who competes in the Bantamweight and Featherweight divisions. A professional since 2016, she fought in Bellator MMA, most notably fighting for the Bellator Women's Featherweight World Championship.

Background
Being born in Moscow, she immigrated to Israel at the age of a year and a half. From the age of three she danced ballet and trained in floor gymnastics and artistic gymnastics. Being asked to lose some weight, she signed up for a gym and trained in kickboxing, weights and aerobics. However, instead of losing weight, she gained weight and muscle mass, and after seeing a video of Ronda Rousey, realized that this was her vocation.

She married at the age of 20, and had her child before the start of her professional MMA career. She also has a degree in interior design.

Rubin participated heavily in Brazilian jiu-jitsu competitions before her MMA career, winning gold medals at the BJJ North Open Championship in 2014 & 2015, Copa de Israel 2015, JJIF Israeli Championship 2015, and Abu Dhabi no-gi 2015.

Mixed martial arts career

Bellator MMA
Making her professional debut at Bellator 164 on November 10, 2016, she defeated Laurita Cibirite via TKO in the first round. Rubin would win her next two bouts on the regional Israeli scene, by first-round TKO against Carmel Ben Shoshan at Desert Combat Challenge 9 and Tetyana Voznuk via unanimous decision at Knockout MMA World Tour 1.

Returning to Bellator, Rubin defeated Joana Filipa Magalhães at Bellator 188 via TKO in the second round.

Rubin faced Cindy Dandois on November 15, 2018, at Bellator 209 She won the fight via unanimous decision.

Rubin was scheduled to face Sinead Kavanagh at Bellator 217 on February 2, 2019, who however pulled out of the bout due to injury. Kavanagh was replaced by Iony Razafiarison, whom Rubin defeated by unanimous decision.

Rubin challenged for the Bellator Women's Featherweight World Championship against reigning champion Julia Budd on July 12, 2019, at Bellator 224. She lost the bout in the first round, getting dropped with a body kick and the ground and pounded to a TKO loss.

The bout against Sinead Kavanagh was rebooked for Bellator 234 on November 15, 2019. Rubin lost via TKO in the second round.

In July 2021, she was released from Bellator.

Invicta FC
In her first appearance post release, Rubin moved down to Bantamweight and faced Priscila de Souza on November 6, 2021, at Oktagon Prime 4. She won the bout via split decision.

Olga challenged for the Invicta FC Bantamweight Championship against reigning champion Taneisha Tennant at Invicta FC 48: Tennant vs. Rubin on July 20, 2022. She lost the close bout by split decision, with scores of 47–48, 48–47 and 50–45.

Rubin faced Serena DeJesus on January 18, 2023, at Invicta FC 51. At weigh-ins, DeJesus came in at 137.3 pounds, 1.3 pounds over the limit and was fined 25% of her purse which went to Rubin. Rubin won the bout via unanimous decision.

Mixed martial arts record

|-
|Win
|align=center|8–3
|Serena DeJesus
|Decision (unanimous)
|Invicta FC 51
|
|align=center|3
|align=center|5:00
|Denver, Colorado, United States
|
|-
|Loss
|align=center|7–3
|Taneisha Tennant
|Decision (split)
|Invicta FC 48
|
|align=center|5
|align=center|5:00
|Denver, Colorado, United States
|
|-
|Win
|align=center| 7–2
|Priscila de Souza
|Decision (split)
|OKTAGON Prime 4
|
|align=center| 3
|align=center| 5:00
|Pardubice, Czech Republic
|
|-
|Loss
|align=center|6–2
|Sinead Kavanagh
|TKO (punches)
|Bellator 234
|
|align=center| 2
|align=center| 4:37
|Tel Aviv, Israel
|
|-
|Loss
|align=center|6–1
|Julia Budd
|TKO (body kick and punches)
|Bellator 224
|
|align=center|1
|align=center|2:14
|Thackerville, Oklahoma, United States
|
|-
|Win
|align=center|6–0
|Iony Razafiarison
|Decision (unanimous)
|Bellator 217
|
|align=center| 3
|align=center| 5:00
|Dublin, Ireland
|
|-
|Win
|align=center|5–0
|Cindy Dandois
|Decision (unanimous)
|Bellator 209
|
|align=center| 3
|align=center| 5:00
|Tel Aviv, Israel
| 
|-
|Win
|align=center|4–0
|Joana Filipa
|TKO (punches)
|Bellator 188
|
|align=center|2
|align=center|3:46
|Tel Aviv, Israel
|
|-
|Win
|align=center|3–0
|Tatiana Voznyuk
|Decision (unanimous)
|KNO World Tour 1
|
|align=center|3
|align=center|5:00
|Ashdod, Israel
|
|-
|Win
|align=center|2–0
|Carmel Ben Shoshan
|TKO (punches)
|Desert Combat Challenge 9
|
|align=center|1
|align=center|4:20
|Beersheba, Israel
|
|-
|Win
|align=center|1–0
|Laurita Likker-Cibirite
|TKO (punches)
|Bellator 164
|
|align=center|1
|align=center|3:12
|Tel Aviv, Israel
|

See also 
 List of current Invicta FC fighters
 List of male mixed martial artists

References

External links
 
 

1989 births
Living people
Martial artists from Moscow
Israeli female mixed martial artists
Russian female mixed martial artists
Featherweight mixed martial artists
Bantamweight mixed martial artists
Mixed martial artists utilizing kickboxing
Mixed martial artists utilizing Brazilian jiu-jitsu
Bellator female fighters
Israeli practitioners of Brazilian jiu-jitsu
Russian practitioners of Brazilian jiu-jitsu
Female Brazilian jiu-jitsu practitioners